Ionian Village is the official international summer camping ministry of the Greek Orthodox Archdiocese of America, and is located on a private facility on the shores of the Ionian Sea in western Peloponnese. Over 17,000 Greek-Americans have visited the camp since its establishment in 1970.

Ionian Village operates a summer travel camp program for Greek-American high school youth. Each summer there are two 20-day sessions, identical in schedule. 200 campers per session fly together from New York to Athens and travel by motor coach to the camp, located near Vartholomio, west of the regional trading town of Amaliada. Summer staff for the camp are selected competitively from qualified Orthodox Christian young adults, in addition to medical staff and summer clergy, principally from United States. 

The daily camp program of Ionian Village consists of two aspects: in camp days and travel days. In camp days feature a blend of athletics, arts and crafts, music and Greek culture, and time for free swim in the Olympic sized pool or the private beach. Travel days include day trips to historical sites in Greece such as ancient Olympia, Kalavryta, Patras, Vartholomio, and the islands of Zakynthos, Kerkyra, Aegina, & Kefalonia. At the end of the program, participants spend 3 nights in Athens, where they get to visit the Acropolis and Changing of the Guards in Syntagma Square, and shop in Monastiraki.

Founding and history

The camp was established in 1970 at the initiative of Archbishop Iakovos of America (of the then-Greek Orthodox Archdiocese of North and South America) as a means of fostering cultural and religious ties to Greece for the children of early-and-mid-20th century Greek immigrants in United States and Canada.

The original land grant of 2,840 acres—11,500 stremmata, or 11.5 square kilometers—of pine forest and beachfront on the north-west coast of Elis, on the Peloponnese mainland was secured by the then-Greek Orthodox Archdiocese of North & South America in 1966 as a gift from the government of Greece, with supportive sponsorship from Greek shipping magnate Aristotle Onassis.

In July 1975, Jacqueline Kennedy Onassis visited the Ionian Village to officiate at the opening of a new recreational building (named the Ethousa) dedicated in memory of Aristotle Onassis. This building would be used for the lodging of clergy and medical staff, "Flextivities", as well as Music & Greek culture activities See this photo of the commemorative plaque unveiled by Mrs. Kennedy-Onassis at the opening.

On the morning of September 8, 2016, a tornado struck Vartholomio as well as neighboring villages. The tornado made first landfall at the Ionian Village campus. The tornado caused extensive damage to the infrastructure, knocking down or uprooting over 600 pine trees, shattering the glass of the pool, destroying the petting zoo, wounding and killing some of the animals in the zoo, wrecking the Trap, destroying the botany that surrounded the walkways, damaging athletic equipment, as well as minor but significant damage to the exteriors of the cabins and the Ethousa. However, the Saint Iakovos Chapel miraculously suffered little to no damage. The damage was estimated to cost around $1.5 million in repair and rejuvenation costs. As of December 25, 2016, the Ionian Village Rebuilding Fund has raised close to $600,000.

Directors 
Marina Floratos, 2022 - Present

Father Gary Kyriacou, 2019 - 2022

Father Evagoras Constantinides, 2011-2019

Father Jason Roll, 2009-2011

Father Constantine Lazarakis, 2001-2008

Michael Pappas, 1996-2001

Father Constantine Sitaras, 1972-1996

Father Nick Soteropoulos, 1971-1972

+ Father George Poulos, 1966 - 1971

The Campground

Notes

External links
 Ionian Village website
 Ionian Village Vimeo videos
 Helicopter video fly-over of Ionian Village seaside campus
 Google Maps satellite view of the Ionian Village campus
 YouTube: Archival home movie of camp session, July 1975
 Travel Blog composed by Rev. Dr. Christopher Metropulos as part of Orthodox Christian Network's reporting visit to Ionian Village, July 2009

Summer camps